Han Ye-seul (Hangul: 한예슬; born Leslie Kim on September 18, 1981) is an American-born South Korean actress. She made her acting debut in the sitcom Nonstop 4 (2003), and has since played leading roles in television dramas such as Couple or Trouble (2006), Tazza (2008), and Birth of a Beauty (2014), as well as the films Miss Gold Digger (2007) and Penny Pinchers (2011).

Early life
Leslie Kim was born and raised in Los Angeles, California. She attended Cerritos High School and graduated from Cerritos College with an associate degree in Computer Graphics. She is fluent in both English and Korean.

Career

Acting debut
She began her modeling career in South Korea after winning the SBS Supermodel Contest in 2001. Under the stage name Han Ye-seul, she made her acting debut in the popular sitcom Nonstop 4 in 2003. Han quickly rose to fame, and she renounced her U.S. citizenship in 2004 and became a naturalized South Korean citizen to continue establishing herself in Korean entertainment. Her performances in Forbidden Love (2004) and That Summer's Typhoon (2005) received poor reviews, with critics dismissing her as primarily a commercial model and not a real actress.

Breakthrough
Han proved her detractors wrong with Couple or Trouble (also known as Fantasy Couple, 2006), a remake of Overboard written by the Hong sisters. Playing a spoiled heiress who becomes an amnesiac after a yacht accident, Han was praised for her comic timing and the series was a hit.

She further embraced the screwball comedy genre with her first film Miss Gold Digger (2007). Despite the film's lackluster box office, Han's portrayal of an advertising executive who juggles four different men in order to catch the ideal husband won her several Best New Actress accolades from local award-giving bodies, including the prestigious Grand Bell Awards and Blue Dragon Film Awards.

Han next starred in Tazza (2008), a TV adaptation of Huh Young-man's manhwa of the same name about gamblers and card sharks. This was followed up with the Lee Kyung-hee-penned Will It Snow for Christmas?, a melodrama about childhood sweethearts who reunite as adults in 2009.

Spy Myung-wol controversy
In 2011, Han was cast as the titular character in Spy Myung-wol, as a North Korean agent on a mission to kidnap a top South Korean Hallyu star, who ends up falling for him. The series gained notoriety when Han failed to show up for her scheduled filming on August 14–15 and instead flew to Los Angeles on August 16; it was the first instance of a leading actor abruptly leaving in the middle of a Korean drama shoot. Her then-agency SidusHQ cited conflicts with television director Hwang In-hyuk over her hectic working conditions, and that exhaustion had compromised her judgment. Han's absence effectively halted production, and the KBS network lambasted her actions as "unilateral, irresponsible and will not be tolerated," while the drama's production company Victory Contents (then known as Victory Productions) threatened legal action. After extensive press coverage, Han returned to Korea and continued filming Spy Myung-wol on August 18. Upon arrival at Incheon International Airport, she apologized but maintained that her demands had been legitimate, stating "I want to believe that I did the right thing." Han drew harsh criticism from TV industry professionals and viewers, but some fans defended her, saying the stressful Korean drama live-shoot system was at fault.

Romantic comedy film Penny Pinchers was released two months after Spy Myung-wol finished airing. In it, Han shed her glamorous image to play an extremely frugal woman who considers love a frivolous expense and teaches an unemployed playboy the art of penny pinching.

Comeback
After the Spy Myung-wol fiasco, public backlash forced Han to go on a three-year hiatus from acting.

In late 2014, she made a successful comeback in Birth of a Beauty, where Han played a warm-hearted ajumma who overcomes her husband's infidelity by undergoing a head-to-toe makeover involving plastic surgery and weight loss. This was followed with leading roles in romantic comedies Madame Antoine: The Love Therapist (2016) where she plays a fake fortune teller, and 20th Century Boy and Girl (2017).

In 2019, Han starred in SBS drama Big Issue, playing a paparazzi journalist who chases after celebrity scandals.

In June 2021, Han signed with new agency High Entertainment.

Personal life
On May 2, 2011, Han hit a man surnamed Do on the hip with the wing mirror of her Porsche while driving into the parking lot of her home in an apartment building in Samseong-dong. Do sustained minor injuries and Han's lawyers offered him  in compensation, but Do claimed that she had fled the scene. Her then-agency SidusHQ denied this, saying she had apologized and checked if he was okay, but did not step out of her vehicle. After an investigation, police cleared Han of the hit-and-run allegations.

Han began dating YG Entertainment record producer Teddy Park in May 2013. The two were reported to have broken up on October 24, 2016.

In January 2015, the FSS included Han in a list of people who were found to have violated the foreign currency-related law by failing to report their asset acquisition, such as real estate overseas, to relevant authorities. This referred to a commercial building in Koreatown, Los Angeles that Han had bought in 2011, but her then-agency KeyEast issued a statement that the omission had been a technical mistake, because Han had transferred the building's ownership to a company in which she was the major shareholder and was unaware that she should report it.

On May 13, 2021 Han revealed through an update from her Instagram that she is currently dating theatrical actor Ryu Sung-jae, who is 10 years younger than her.

Filmography

Film

Television series

Hosting and variety show

Music video appearances

Discography

Awards and nominations

References

External links

 
 
 

1981 births
Living people
South Korean television actresses
South Korean film actresses
South Korean female models
Actresses from Los Angeles
American emigrants to South Korea
American people of South Korean descent
American people of Korean descent
Former United States citizens